The Icelandic chicken is a type of chicken from Iceland. Called íslenska hænan (Icelandic chicken), Haughænsni (pile chicken) or landnámshænan (hen of the settlers) in the Icelandic language. They are a landrace fowl which are rare outside their native country. They have been present on the island since introduction by Norse settlers in the 9th century.

Icelandic chickens are hardy in different climates, thrifty and make excellent farm and ranch birds. They are also adaptable enough to thrive in backyard conditions, and when raised by calm people who spend time with them, are often very friendly and trusting. They are not a modern dual purpose breed but do lay a lot of medium-sized white to pale tan eggs, and often lay over a long lifetime and during winter months. Some hens in every flock will go broody and be excellent mothers. Icelandics are medium-sized and have a small carcass weight (about 2.5 pounds for a five month old cockerel). 

Icelandic chickens are alert and react quickly to danger but are not immune to predation by wild animals, hawks and dogs. A secure coop for night is a must, and good fencing and/or a livestock guard dog will help their survival. Icelandic chickens love to forage, dig in manure and compost piles, and can fly quite well, which helps them to roost as high as they are able to at night.

Icelandic chickens are not standardized in appearance, possess a wide range of plumage colors and patterns, and comb types. Some have feather crests. The Eigenda- og ræktendafélag landnámshænsna (ERL) or The Owners and Breeders Association of Landnámshænan in Iceland, has written a description of the landrace. Being a landrace, and capable of evolving to conditions it lives in, it cannot have a Standard of Perfection that a Breed has. Unlike a modern chicken breed that commonly has an inbred factor of 12%, Icelandics have proven by DNA analysis to be remarkably genetically diverse.

See also
 List of chicken breeds
 Icelandic cattle
 Icelandic goat
 Icelandic horse
 Icelandic sheep
 Icelandic sheepdog

References

External links
 History of Icelandic Chicken
 Facebook group that acts as the North American and Icelandic club
  The Livestock Conservancy Icelandic Chicken page
 Mother Earth News article by Harvey Ussery on Icelandic Chickens 
 Icelandic Icelandic Chicken breeder in Iceland: photos

Chicken breeds originating in Iceland
Chicken landraces